Anja Kaspersen is a senior fellow at Carnegie Council for Ethics in International Affairs.  She is the former Director of the United Nations Office for Disarmament Affairs in Geneva and Deputy Secretary General of the Conference on Disarmament (UNODA). Previously, she held the role as the head of strategic engagement and new technologies at the International Committee of the Red Cross (ICRC).  Prior to joining the ICRC she served as a senior director for geopolitics and international security and a member of the executive committee at the World Economic Forum.

Kaspersen has also worked in business and has had a rich diplomatic and academic career. She is a published author, podcast host and a global public speaker and commentator on matters relating to geopolitics, international security, peacekeeping, arms control, multilateral diplomacy, emerging technology ethics, AI, cyber conflict and digital resilience. She is a strong believer in multilateralism and in the power of science and technology diplomacy to ensure adaptive arms control, responsible innovation and applications.

Anja Kaspersen is an alumni International Gender Champion, a member of the International Telecommunication Union, AI for Good Global Summit's Programme Committee, a member of the IEEE Council on Extended Intelligence and Industry Activities on Ethics in Action in Autonomous and Intelligence Systems, Well-Being Initiative, Life Science Innovation and AI  and member of the Council of the International Military Council on Climate and Security  and the advisory board of ThinkTech.

Kaspersen was selected for several consecutive years as one of the leading female Voices in the field of AI and ethics and recognised among peers as a fierce advocate for women, diversity and interdisciplinarity. In 2019 she was included in the "100 Brilliant Women in AI Ethics list".

In addition to raise international and multilateral efforts to establish a dialogue on the impact of new technologies and AI, Kaspersen has supported several other initiatives aimed at deepening public-private understanding and cooperation. She was selected in 2020 as one of the top innovators by the World Summit AI and Inspired Minds for her work among top 50 Innovators.

Education and career 
Kaspersen attended The London School of Economics and Political Science (LSE) and earned her Master of Science degree. In 2017 she entered the Executive Programme at IMD Business School.

Publications 
Anja T. Kaspersen, "Transition Management", «Challenges to Collective Security» Working Papers from NUPI's UN Programme.

Anja T. Kaspersen and Ole Jacob Sending, "The United Nations and Civilian Crisis Management", Working Papers from NUPI's UN Programme.

References 

Norwegian political scientists
Year of birth missing (living people)
Living people
Artificial intelligence researchers
Artificial intelligence ethicists
Alumni of the London School of Economics
Norwegian officials of the United Nations
Women political scientists